Gary Moten (born April 3, 1961) is a former American football linebacker. He played for the San Francisco 49ers in 1983, the Los Angeles Express, New Jersey Generals and Winnipeg Blue Bombers in 1985, the Saskatchewan Roughriders in 1986, the Toronto Argonauts from 1986 to 1987 and for the Kansas City Chiefs in 1987.

References

1961 births
Living people
Sportspeople from Galveston, Texas
American football linebackers
Players of American football from Texas
SMU Mustangs football players
San Francisco 49ers players
Los Angeles Express players
New Jersey Generals players
Winnipeg Blue Bombers players
Saskatchewan Roughriders players
Toronto Argonauts players
Kansas City Chiefs players